The Bement Covered Bridge is a historic wooden covered bridge on Center Road over the Warner River in Bradford, New Hampshire. A Long-truss bridge, it was built in 1854, and is one of New Hampshire's small number of surviving 19th-century covered bridges.  It was listed on the National Register of Historic Places in 1976.

Description and history
The Bement Covered Bridge is located just south of Bradford's main village, carrying Center Road over the Warner River just south of New Hampshire Route 103 near the Bradford Pines Natural Area. It rests on stone abutments that have been partially faced and topped with concrete. It is covered by a gabled roof, and its sidewalls are clad in vertical board siding.

This bridge was built in 1854, and is the third bridge to occupy the site. Although it has long been thought that the patentee of the trusses, Stephen Long, was responsible for its construction, there is no documentary support for this. It is possible that Long's brother, Dr. Moses Long, a resident of nearby Warner, may have played a role in its construction as an agent for his brother. The bridge is named for local resident Samuel Bement, whose property the second (1818) bridge was identified as being near in town records. The bridge has undergone several restorations, including in 1947 and 1968-69. It provides access to only a modest number of residences.

The bridge was upgraded and restored in 2020-21 by Daniels Construction of Ascutney, VT. The budget of $1.65 million was mostly paid for by state and federal funds, with Bradford contributing approximately $205,000.

See also

List of New Hampshire covered bridges
National Register of Historic Places listings in Merrimack County, New Hampshire
List of bridges on the National Register of Historic Places in New Hampshire

References

External links

Bement Bridge, New Hampshire Division of Historical Resources

Covered bridges on the National Register of Historic Places in New Hampshire
Bridges completed in 1854
Wooden bridges in New Hampshire
Tourist attractions in Merrimack County, New Hampshire
Bridges in Merrimack County, New Hampshire
National Register of Historic Places in Merrimack County, New Hampshire
Bradford, New Hampshire
Road bridges on the National Register of Historic Places in New Hampshire
1854 establishments in New Hampshire